Wyre Forest is a county constituency represented in the House of Commons of the Parliament of the United Kingdom.   It elects one Member of Parliament (MP) by the first past the post system of election. The current MP is Mark Garnier of the Conservative Party who was  re-elected in the 2019 general election.

Members of Parliament

Boundaries 

The Wyre Forest constituency as it was drawn for the 1997 election was almost coterminous with the Wyre Forest district, with around 2,000 extra electors from the district in the neighbouring Leominster constituency. Following its review of parliamentary constituencies for the 2010 election, the Boundary Commission recommended that the portions of the district currently in Leominster move into this seat, making the constituency and district wholly coterminous. These changes were brought about in part by the consideration of Worcestershire and Herefordshire separately for the drawing of parliamentary constituency boundaries.

2010–present: The District of Wyre Forest.

1997–2010: All the wards of the District of Wyre Forest except the Rock and Ribbesford ward.

1983–1997: The District of Wyre Forest.

History 
The Wyre Forest constituency was first fought under its present name in the 1983 general election, having succeeded the old Kidderminster seat, and was won for the Conservatives by Esmond Bulmer. Wyre Forest was held with relative ease by the Conservatives' Anthony Coombs in the 1987 and 1992 general elections; however the 1997 Labour landslide saw that party gain the seat with David Lock securing a majority of almost 7,000. Anger over the downgrading of Kidderminster Hospital reflected on Lock at the 2001 election, and Health Concern's Richard Taylor stormed to a decisive victory, then held the seat with a considerably reduced majority in 2005. Taylor lost to the Conservatives in the 2010 general election.

Turnout in the Wyre Forest at general elections has generally been around 2-3% above the national average, but in 2001 the constituency recorded a 68.0% turnout as against 59.4% nationally; this spike (not repeated in 2005) is widely attributed to the intense local feelings on the hospital issue.

Elections

Elections in the 2010s

Elections in the 2000s

Elections in the 1990s

Elections in the 1980s

See also 
 List of parliamentary constituencies in Herefordshire and Worcestershire

References

Parliamentary constituencies in Worcestershire
Constituencies of the Parliament of the United Kingdom established in 1983